Loop 108 is a  state highway loop in Port Bolivar, Texas.

Route description
Loop 108 begins at an intersection with SH 87 near Fort Travis Seashore Park on the Gulf of Mexico in Galveston County, heading northwest on two-lane undivided 7th Street. The road heads through marshland before heading into the community of Port Bolivar. Here, Loop 108 turns northeast onto Broadway Avenue while Spur 108 continues northwest on 7th Street. The highway heads between residential areas and wetlands before leaving Port Bolivar. Loop 108 runs through more coastal marshes and turns southeast onto Kingston Beach Road, ending at another intersection with SH 87.

History
The designation originally belonged to Spur 108, which was designated on July 1, 1940 from U.S. Highway 281 to Lipan. On March 26, 1942, this route was redesignated as FM 7, which was redesignated as an extension of FM 4 on October 23, 1949. On March 26, 1980, the present routing was designated, replacing a former route of FM 2612.

Major intersections

References

108
Transportation in Galveston County, Texas